The BYU Cougars football team is the college football program representing Brigham Young University (BYU) in Provo, Utah. The Cougars began collegiate football competition in 1922, and have won 23 conference championships and one national championship in 1984. 

The team has competed in several different athletic conferences during its history, but since July 1, 2011, they have competed as an Independent.  On September 10, 2021, the Big 12 Conference unanimously accepted BYU’s application to the conference. BYU will begin Big 12 play in the 2023-24 season. 

The team plays home games at the 63,470-seat LaVell Edwards Stadium, named after head coach LaVell Edwards who won 19 conference championships, seven bowl games, and one national championship (1984) while coaching at BYU.

History

Early history

BYU traces its football roots back to the late 19th century. Benjamin Cluff became the third principal of Brigham Young Academy (the precursor to BYU) in 1892 (the school was converted into a university in 1903) and was influenced by his collegiate studies at the University of Michigan to bring athletic competition to Brigham Young. The first BYU football team in 1896 played the University of Utah (winning 12–4), the Elks, the Crescents, the YMCA of Salt Lake City, the Wheel Club of Denver, and Westminster College; and it ultimately won the championship. In its second year of competition, the BYA football team won the championship too, but as a result of an accidental football-related death in Utah in 1900, football was banned from all LDS Church schools until 1919.

After a 20-year ban on football, the sport was brought back to BYU on an intramural basis in 1919, and intercollegiate games were resumed in 1920 under coach Alvin Twitchell. BYU was admitted to the Rocky Mountain Conference in 1921 and had its first winning year in 1929 under the helm of coach G. Ott Romney, who BYU recruited from Montana State University the year before. Romney and his successor Eddie Kimball ushered in a new era in Cougar football in which the team went 65–51–12 between 1928–1942. In 1932, the Cougars posted an 8–1 record and outscored their opponents 188–50, which remains one of the school's finest seasons on record. The university did not field a team from 1943–1945 due to World War II, and in 1949 suffered its only winless season, going 0–11.

The team began to rebuild in the mid-1950s, recruiting University of Rhode Island head coach Hal Kopp to lead the Cougars, who achieved back-to-back winning seasons in 1957 and 1958, led by southpaw quarterback Jared Stephens and nose tackle Gavin Anae. In 1961, Eldon "The Phantom" Fortie became the school's first All-American, and in 1962, BYU moved to the Western Athletic Conference. In 1964, Cougar Stadium was built, which included a capacity of 30,000, and in 1965, head coach Tommy Hudspeth led the Cougars to their first conference championship with a record of 6–4.

LaVell Edwards era (1972–2000)

In 1972, assistant coach LaVell Edwards was promoted to head coach, succeeding Hudspeth. Edwards and his staff installed a drop-back passing game considered to be an early implementation of the West Coast offense, resulting in Cougar Pete Van Valkenburg as the nation's leading rusher for that year. The following year, the Cougars struggled to a 5–6 finish, but this would be Edwards' only losing season during his run as BYU coach over the next three decades. In fact, the Cougars won the conference championship every year except one from 1974 to 1985, including the national championship in 1984. However, the Cougars lost their first four bowl games. Their first post-season win came in the 1980 Holiday Bowl, which has become known as the "Miracle Bowl" since BYU was trailing SMU 45–25 with four minutes left in the game and then came back to win. BYU would win its 1981, 1983, and 1984 bowl games as well; and it earned the nickname "Quarterback U" for consistently producing All-American quarterbacks, which included Gifford Nielsen, Marc Wilson, Jim McMahon and Steve Young. During this period, Young finished second for the Heisman Trophy in 1983 and McMahon finished third for the trophy in 1981.

In 1984, BYU reached the pinnacle of college football when it was recognized as college football national champions, being the only unbeaten, untied team in the nation. The undefeated Cougars (12–0–0) opened the season with a 20–14 victory over Pitt (3-7-1), ranked No. 3 in the nation at the time and finished the season with a victory over the Michigan Wolverines (6–5–0). The victory over Michigan, 24–17 in the Holiday Bowl, marked the only time a national champion played in a bowl game before New Year's Day, and the last time a national championship was determined by a team from a non-power 5 conference. Coupled with the 11 consecutive wins to close out the 1983 season, BYU concluded the 1984 championship on a 24-game winning streak. At the end of the season, BYU was voted National Champion after being number one in all four NCAA sanctioned polls AP, Coaches, NFF, and FWAA.

In 1985, quarterback Robbie Bosco finished third in the Heisman balloting; in 1986, defensive lineman Jason Buck became the first BYU player ever to win the Outland Trophy; and in 1989, offensive lineman Mo Elewonibi also won the Outland Trophy. In 1990, the Cougars achieved their first victory over a top-ranked team when they defeated the No. 1 Miami Hurricanes early in the season, and the season culminated with quarterback Ty Detmer becoming BYU's first and only Heisman Trophy winner. In 1996, BYU won the first ever WAC Championship Game in Las Vegas and earned a bid to play in the Cotton Bowl against Kansas State of the newly formed Big 12 Conference, making it BYU's first ever New Year's Day bowl game, which they won 19–15. BYU finished ranked No. 5 in both the Coaches and AP polls, and became the first team in NCAA history to win 14 games in a season.

Mountain West era (1999–2011)
In 1999, BYU left the WAC along with seven other teams to form the Mountain West Conference, with the Cougars winning a share of the inaugural MWC championship. With the change of conferences, BYU also debuted a new color scheme, featuring a darker shade of blue, a redesigned cougar logo, and the introduction of tan as an accent color. 1999 also featured the controversial "bib" home uniforms, which only lasted for one season.

Just prior to the 2000 season, Edwards announced that it would be his final year as the program's head coach, and prior to Edwards' final home game, The Church of Jesus Christ of Latter-day Saints President Gordon B. Hinckley announced that Cougar Stadium would be renamed "LaVell Edwards Stadium". After punter Aaron Edwards threw a last second touchdown pass on a fake punt, Coach Edwards was carried off the field following the season closer against the Utes.

Former Chicago Bears offensive coordinator Gary Crowton was hired to replace Edwards. His first season in 2001 was successful, earning a 12–2 record and running back Luke Staley earning the Doak Walker Award, but the Cougars posted losing records the following three seasons (including only nine conference wins)–BYU's first losing records in three decades. His teams also received negative publicity for infractions of the university's honor code. He was forced to resign on December 1, 2004. BYU originally offered the job to Utah defensive coordinator Kyle Whittingham, who had played for Edwards in the late 1970s. However, when Whittingham opted instead to become head coach at Utah, the Cougars instead offered the job to BYU defensive coordinator Bronco Mendenhall, who accepted.

Bronco Mendenhall brought stability and success to the BYU program after the Crowton years. At the time of his hiring, the 38-year-old Mendenhall was the second youngest Division 1 football head coach in the country. As the legendary LaVell Edwards told him shortly after being hired, "‘You have a tough job.’ Then there was a pause and silence,” says Mendenhall. “It wasn’t very comforting to hear that. But then he just said, ‘But it’s a great job.’”

Mendenhall led BYU to a bowl game every season he was head coach and saw Top 25 finishes in 2006, 2007, 2008, and 2009.

Independent (2011–2022)
On September 1, 2010, BYU announced it would begin competition as a football independent starting in the 2011 season, primarily due to years of frustration with the lack of TV coverage in the Mountain West Conference and the University of Utah's departure for the Pac-12 Conference. That same day, BYU announced an 8-year contract with ESPN in which 11 games would be broadcast on one of the ESPN networks and BYU would retain the rights to utilize its on-campus broadcasting facilities and nationally syndicated station. The Cougars were reportedly considered for invitations by the Big XII Conference and former Big East Conference for all sports during this period, but neither opted to add BYU.

In February 2011, CFL's Most Outstanding Canadian Award-winner Ben Cahoon joined the coaching staff as the wide receivers coach.

In 2011, BYU changed quarterbacks mid-season from sophomore Jake Heaps to junior Riley Nelson, and in 2012 three different quarterbacks were utilized at different points in the season. During the 2012 offseason, graduated defensive end Ziggy Ansah was drafted as the No. 5 overall pick of the 2013 NFL Draft, tied for the highest draft BYU alumnus with Jim McMahon '82. For the 2013 BYU football season, the Cougars were slated to compete against four pre-season-ranked teams.

In January 2015, the Atlantic Coast Conference (ACC), which had previously announced that from 2017 forward all members had to play at least one non-conference game each season against a "Power 5" team (i.e., a school in the ACC, Big Ten, Big 12, Pac-12, or SEC, plus Notre Dame, an FBS independent but otherwise an ACC member), announced that games against BYU would not count toward the "Power 5" requirement, a stipulation also held by the SEC. Weeks later, both leagues reversed course and opted to count games against BYU and the other remaining FBS independent at that time, Army, toward meeting the P5 provision. In the case of the SEC, this change in policy was driven more by the trend of "Power 5" leagues requiring nine conference games. At the time of the report, the Big Ten, Big 12, and Pac-12 either had nine-game conference schedules or were introducing them in the near future. The ACC has an eight-game schedule, but also has a scheduling alliance with Notre Dame that has five ACC members playing the Fighting Irish each season. Additionally, three SEC teams had a total of five games scheduled with BYU from 2015 to 2020. In July 2015, the Big Ten announced that games against BYU would count toward the conference's "Power 5" scheduling requirement that takes effect in 2016. In late 2015, the Big XII Conference added a Power Five non-conference scheduling requirement and stated that BYU would not count toward filling that mandate.

On December 4, 2015, Mendenhall accepted the head coach position with Virginia in the Atlantic Coast Conference (ACC). His 99 wins in 11 seasons are second all-time in school history, behind only Edwards.

BYU spent more than a week courting Navy Midshipmen football head coach Ken Niumatalolo to take over the Cougars program. After several days, which included a visit to Provo and public remarks about considering the job, Niumatalolo ultimately declined BYU's offer in order to remain with Navy. Athletics director Tom Holmoe moved on to several other potential candidates and on Dec. 19 introduced Oregon State defensive coordinator and former Cougars fullback Kalani Sitake as BYU's next head coach.

At the time of his hiring, Kalani Sitake said, "I'm grateful for everything BYU gave me as a player. It's a dream come true for me to return home."

While many have questioned whether independence long-term is sustainable, from a financial perspective it appears to be so. BYU's ESPN contract is worth somewhere between $6–10 million annually, which is on par with what ACC teams received from a contract also negotiated around the same time. ESPN was happy enough with its contract with BYU that it exercised an option to extend the deal through the 2019 season. ESPN also helps BYU line up bowl deals, since as an independent, BYU is not part of any league bowl tie-ins.

BYU's estimated $67 million in annual revenue places it 55th in total revenue in 2018. That's comparable to the lower half of the Pac-12 and more than any G5 school, including every Mountain West institution. In fact, the highest earning MWC team, San Diego State, had $30 million in revenue, with more than 46% of that subsidized by the state of California. The G5 school with the most revenue without a subsidy is UCONN with $43 million, still nearly $20 million below BYU.

Even as an independent, BYU is one of just a handful of schools in all of college athletics to generate a profit, enjoying five times the G5 average revenue ($13 million).

On September 10, 2021, the Big 12 Conference announced they had sent invitations to BYU to join, along with Cincinnati, UCF, and Houston. BYU accepted the invitation and will begin competing in the conference in the 2023 season.

Conference affiliations
 Rocky Mountain Athletic Conference (1922–1937)
 Skyline Conference (1938–1961)
 Western Athletic Conference (1962–1998)
 Mountain West Conference (1999–2010)
 NCAA Division I FBS independent (2011–2022)
 Big 12 Conference (2023–present)

Championships

National championships
In 1984, BYU was awarded a consensus National Championship.

Conference championships

† Co-champions

Division championships
BYU has won two division champsionships, both in the Western Athletic Conference.

† Co-champions

Bowl games
BYU  has made 40 bowl appearances with a record of 17–22–1. They have played in the Holiday Bowl (4–6–1), the Cotton Bowl Classic (1–0), the Las Vegas Bowl (3–3), the Copper Bowl (1–0),  the Tangerine/Citrus Bowl (0–2), the Freedom Bowl (1–1), the Liberty Bowl (0–2), the Aloha Bowl (0–1), the Fiesta Bowl (0–1), the Motor City Bowl (0–1), the All-American Bowl (0–1), the New Mexico Bowl (2–0), the Armed Forces Bowl (1–0), the Poinsettia Bowl (2–0),  Fight Hunger Bowl (0–1), the Miami Beach Bowl (0–1), the Famous Idaho Potato Bowl (1–0), Hawaii Bowl (0–1), Boca Raton Bowl (1–0), and the Independence Bowl (0-1).

Head coaches

Rivalries
BYU's football program has two historic rivalries: one with the Utah Utes in a game referred to as "The Holy War", and another with the Utah State Aggies in "The Battle for the Old Wagon Wheel". BYU competes with Utah, and Utah State for the Beehive Boot. Both of these series have experienced dormancy in recent years due to various conference changes between the three programs.

Utah

Utah leads the series 62–35–4 through the 2021 season.

Utah State	

BYU leads the series with Utah State 51–37–3 through the 2022 season.

Record book

Honors and awards

Team awards for the BYU Cougars include 23 conference titles and one national championship in 1984. For player awards, BYU has produced 52 All-Americans (13 Consensus All-Americans),.

Heisman Trophy
Ty Detmer – 1990
Heisman Trophy finalists
Gary Sheide – 1974... 8th
Gifford Nielsen — 1976... 6th
Marc Wilson — 1979... 3rd
Jim McMahon — 1980... 5th
Jim McMahon — 1981... 3rd
Steve Young — 1983... 2nd
Robbie Bosco — 1984... 3rd
Robbie Bosco — 1985... 3rd
Ty Detmer — 1989... 9th
Ty Detmer — 1991... 3rd
Zach Wilson — 2020... 8th
Maxwell Award
Ty Detmer – 1990
Davey O'Brien Award
Jim McMahon – 1981
Steve Young — 1983
Ty Detmer — 1990, 1991
Sammy Baugh Trophy
Gary Sheide – 1974
Marc Wilson — 1979
Jim McMahon — 1981
Steve Young — 1983
Robbie Bosco — 1984
Ty Detmer — 1991
Steve Sarkisian — 1996
Doak Walker Award
Luke Staley – 2001
Jim Brown Trophy
Luke Staley – 2001
Outland Trophy
Jason Buck – 1986
Mohammed Elewonibi — 1989

For coaching, LaVell Edwards received the Bobby Dodd Coach of the Year Award in 1979, the AFCA (Kodak) Coach of the Year Award in 1984, and the Amos Alonzo Stagg Award (career achievement) in 2003.

College Football Hall of Fame

Retired numbers

All-Americans
 Phil Odle, DE- 1967 (CP-3rd Team)
 Jeff Slipp, DE- 1969 (AP-3rd Team)
Gordon Gravelle, G- 1971 (AP-2nd; NEA-2nd)
 Pete Van Valkenburg, RB- 1972 (AP-3rd)

BYU and the NFL

Pro Football Hall of Fame members

Cougars as an NFL Head Coach
 Andy Reid, tackle 1978–80, starter on 1980 Holiday Bowl champion team, two-time Super Bowl Champion head coach (LIV, LVII with the Kansas City Chiefs), 2002 AP Coach of the Year as head coach of the Philadelphia Eagles, 5th all-time in NFL history in wins overall, 2nd most playoff wins in NFL history.

Uniforms 

From the 1970s to 1999—a period coinciding with some of the school's best and most prominent football seasons—BYU school colors were royal blue and white.  The football team generally wore royal blue jerseys and white pants at home, and white jerseys and royal blue pants on the road.

In 1999, Coach Edwards' penultimate year, the school colors switched to dark blue, white, and tan, and the football helmets switched from white to dark blue. The block 'Y' remained on the sides of the helmet but received a new, more modern treatment. The home uniforms consisted of dark blue jerseys with white "bib" and dark blue pants, and the away uniforms consisted of white jerseys with white pants.  These new uniforms were disliked by both the conservative fans in Provo and the NCAA, who required the team to remove the white bib on the front of the blue home jersey in 2000 (NCAA rules require that a team's jersey have a single dominant color). The home jersey thereafter was modified with blue replacing the white on the bib area.

These uniforms lasted until 2004, when a uniform new style incorporating New York Jets-style shoulder stripes was introduced (the helmets remained the same).  The new uniforms were worn in a "mix-and-match" strategy—e.g., the home blue jerseys were worn with either blue or white pants and the white away jerseys were worn with either blue or white pants.  This uniform incarnation lasted for only one season.

Ultimately, the traditional design with the white helmet and former logo was re-introduced for the 2005 season.  While the uniforms were also changed to be similar to the 1980s uniforms, the darker blue remained instead of the former royal blue, but all tan highlights were eliminated. This change was done at the insistence of new head coach Bronco Mendenhall, who wanted to return the team to the successful traditions of the 1980s. Normally, it takes a minimum of 1–2 years to create, design and approve a uniform change. When Nike, the team's uniform supplier, said that they could not possibly make the change in just five months, former head coach and BYU legend LaVell Edwards made a call to Nike and asked them to help the new Cougar coach. Edwards had worked with Nike on several occasions since his retirement, and with the legendary coach's weight behind the request, BYU was able to take the field in 2005 in new, traditional uniforms. One slight change in the uniform came in the 2007 season, when a small traditional 'Y' logo was added to the bottom of the collar.

In 2009, BYU used a throwback jersey paying tribute to the 25-year anniversary of the 1984 national championship. They were the same design as the contemporary jerseys, but used royal blue instead of navy blue. They were introduced against rival University of Utah and again in the Las Vegas Bowl against Oregon State.

On October 13, 2012, BYU debuted a "blackout" jersey for a home game against Oregon State with royal blue accents and black facemasks. The endzones were also painted black for the occasion. In subsequent seasons, BYU has often had one blackout game per year.

In 2013, BYU introduced an all-royal combination (with the exception of the helmets, which remained its traditional white) against Utah. They wore it once more the following year against Utah State. The combination did not reappear until the 2018 Potato Bowl against Western Michigan. In 2015, renditions of the "throwback" royal blue uniforms appeared, once in the team's Homecoming game against East Carolina, and again against Utah in the Las Vegas Bowl.

With the hiring of Kalani Sitake as head coach at the end of 2015, BYU has seen the gradual return of wearing royal blue combinations. They initially only made appearances in rivalry and other campus event games, but from 2017 onward, they have been worn more regularly. In 2019, several new combinations were introduced, including an all-white combination with royal accents, and a variation on the "away" combination with some styling changes to pay tribute to the uniforms of the 1960s. This last alternate uniform was accompanied by a throwback midfield logo and an endzone paint scheme that matched the field design used by BYU in the 1960s. A more modern design of the retro combination appeared in a game at the end of the season at San Diego State.

In 2020, the team reintroduced a gray facemask that paid tribute to former Cougar and Houston Oilers quarterback Gifford Nielsen for their game at the University of Houston. The team wore the gray facemasks several times that season, which was highlighted by the most frequent usage of the royal blue in decades.

In March 2021, the program added two new helmets to their collection, with royal blue helmets paying tribute to the teams of the 1970s and navy blue helmets reminiscent of the combinations used from 1999-2004; the navy helmet especially recognized the highly successful 2001 team that featured players such as Luke Staley and Brandon Doman.

Alumni

As of 2008, 146 BYU Cougars football players have gone on to play professional football. Team alumni have competed in 48 NFL Super Bowls, including Super Bowl MVP Steve Young and two-time Super Bowl winner Jim McMahon. One former Cougar has won multiple Super Bowls as a coach, Andy Reid who won Super Bowl LIV and Super Bowl LVII as a head coach with the Kansas City Chiefs and Super Bowl XXXI as an assistant with the Green Bay Packers.

Future schedules
Future schedules as of September 11, 2022.

With BYU's acceptance of an invitation to join the Big 12 Conference effective with the 2023–24 athletic season, the future planned schedule is now in flux. Many of the listed games beyond 2022 will be canceled to accommodate future in-conference game scheduling. In particular, future games against two other teams joining the Big 12 in 2023, UCF Knights (2023 and 2024) and Houston Cougars (2023), will become in-conference games if future Big 12 scheduling allows.

2023

2024

2025

2026

2027

2028

2029

2030

2031

2032

2033

2035

See also
 Haka performed by non-New Zealand sports teams § Brigham Young University

References

External links

 

 
American football teams established in 1922
1922 establishments in Utah

fr:BYU Cougars